Raymond Thomas Miller, Sr. (January 10, 1893 – July 13, 1966), commonly known as Ray T. Miller, was an American politician who served as the 43rd mayor of Cleveland, and the chairman of the Cuyahoga County Democratic Party for over twenty years.

Life and career
Miller was born in Defiance, Ohio. He attended University of Notre Dame and received his Bachelor of Laws degree in 1914. He joined the Ohio National Guard and served in France during World War I. After the war, Miller began practicing law in Cleveland. In 1928, he was elected county prosecutor and had a hand in defeating the city manager plan. He defeated Daniel E. Morgan for mayor in a special election in February 1932, becoming the first Democrat to serve as the city's mayor since Newton D. Baker. In his tenure, Miller reduced expenditures to cope with the misery brought by the Great Depression. He was defeated by returning Cleveland politician and former mayor, Harry L. Davis, when he ran for reelection in 1933.

In 1938, Miller became chairman of the Cuyahoga County Democratic Party. As chairman, he succeeded in attracting ethnic European and African American voters to the party, which allowed the Democrats to "elect mayors for 30 years" and secure a Democratic majority in Cleveland City Council. Miller resigned as chairman in 1964.

Miller founded and owned radio stations WERE (1300 AM) and WERE-FM (98.5) in Cleveland; through his Cleveland Broadcasting Incorporated name, Miller later purchased WLEC and WLEC-FM in Sandusky, Ohio; and KFAC (1330 AM) and KFAC (92.3 FM) in Los Angeles, California.

Death
Miller died suddenly of a heart attack at his home in Shaker Heights, Ohio, on May 21, 1966. He was buried at Calvary Cemetery in Cleveland.

References

1893 births
1966 deaths
University of Notre Dame alumni
Mayors of Cleveland
American military personnel of World War I
People from Defiance, Ohio
20th-century American politicians
People from Shaker Heights, Ohio
Ohio National Guard personnel